Pericosmidae is a family of echinoderms belonging to the order Spatangoida.

Genera:
 Faorina Gray, 1851 
 Pericosmus L.Agassiz, 1847
 Platyspatus Pomel, 1883
 Sinaechinus

References

Spatangoida
Echinoderm families